The 2010 FIBA Africa Basketball Club Championship (25th edition), was an international basketball tournament  held in Cotonou, Benin from 10 December to 19 December 2010. The tournament, organized by FIBA Africa, and hosted by ASO Modele, was contested by 11 clubs split into 2 groups, the top four of which qualifying for the knock-out stage, quarter, semi-finals and final.
 
The tournament was won by Primeiro de Agosto from Angola, thus retaining the title.

Draw

Squads

Preliminary rounds

Times given below are in UTC+1.

Group A

Group B

Knockout stage

9–11th place

Quarter finals

9th place

5–8th place

Semifinals

7th place

5th place

Bronze medal game

Gold medal game

Final standings

Primeiro de Agosto rosterAdilson Baza, Adolfo Quimbamba, Carlos Almeida, Felizardo Ambrósio, Filipe Abraão, Hélder Ortet, Hermenegildo Santos, Joaquim Gomes, Karlton Mims, Mário Correia, Miguel Lutonda, Vladimir Ricardino Coach: Luís Magalhães

All Tournament Team

See also 
2011 FIBA Africa Championship

References

External links 
 

2010 FIBA Africa Basketball Club Championship
2010 FIBA Africa Basketball Club Championship
2010 FIBA Africa Basketball Club Championship
Sport in Benin